Carl Emil Rudolf Ludwig Becker (31 August 1862, Hamelin - 12 February 1926, Hamburg) was a German marine artist.

Life and work 
His father was a military doctor. In 1866, as a result of the annexation of the Kingdom of Hanover by the Kingdom of Prussia, his father was transferred to Altona (now part of Hamburg), where he grew up. He attended the realschule there, and received his first art lessons from the marine painter, . In 1887, he enrolled at the Kunstakademie Düsseldorf. Until 1893, he was a student of the landscape painter, Eugen Dücker, He also studied engraving and etching with Carl Ernst Forberg.

He was awarded gold medals at the International Art Exhibition of 1894, in Vienna, and the Große Berliner Kunstausstellung of 1896. After the turn of the century, marine painting was heavily promoted by Kaiser Wilhelm II, who was attempting to make Germany a major sea power. As a result, the demand for Becker's paintings increased farther inland.

His studio was in a suburb of Düsseldorf, and he worked mostly by commissions. This included a major one for murals in the German shipping pavilion at the Exposition Universelle of 1900, in Paris.

He was married to Annette Otto; daughter of Nicolaus Otto, the inventor who developed one of the first internal combustion engines. Their son, Claus, was born in 1902. The following year, they returned to Hamburg. Claus displayed an early aptitude for art and also became a painter, in a wide variety of genres. He died in Hamburg in 1983.

References

Further reading 
 Hermann Board: "Becker, Carl", In: Ulrich Thieme, Felix Becker (Eds.): Allgemeines Lexikon der Bildenden Künstler von der Antike bis zur Gegenwart, Vol.3: Bassano–Bickham. Wilhelm Engelmann, Leipzig 1909, pg.149 (Online)
  Axel Feuß: "Becker, Carl", In: Allgemeines Künstlerlexikon, Vol.8, Saur, Munich, 1993,  pg.156

External links 

 More works by Becker @ ArtNet

1862 births
1926 deaths
19th-century German painters
German marine artists
Kunstakademie Düsseldorf alumni
People from Hamelin
20th-century German painters